Clement Scotus  may refer to:

Clement of Ireland or Clement Scotus (ca. 750 – 818), venerated as a saint by the Catholic Church
Clement Scotus I (fl. 745), bishop
Clement Scotus II, grammarian